The French surname Abbadie or d'Abbadie, meaning "(of the) abbey", may refer to:

Antoine-Thomson d'Abbadie (1810–1897), French explorer of notably Ethiopia
Arnaud-Michel d'Abbadie (1815–1893), Antoine-Thomson d'Abbadie's brother, also an explorer
Jakob Abbadie (c.1654–1727), Swiss theologian
Jean-Jacques Blaise d'Abbadie (1726–1765), governor of French Louisiana
Julio Abbadie (1930–2014), Uruguayan footballer
Luis G. Abbadie (born 1968), Mexican writer
 Harry d'Abbadie d'Arrast (1897–1968), Argentinean born French screenwriter

See also

Abbadia (disambiguation)
Badia (disambiguation)

French-language surnames